Graneledone boreopacifica is an octopus in the family Megaleledonidae. It can be found in both the Pacific and Atlantic Oceans.

The holotype of this species measures 9 cm in mantle length.

The type specimen was collected in the Pacific Ocean (50°N, 151°E) and is deposited at the Zoological Institute in Saint Petersburg, Russia.

A female Graneledone boreopacifica was observed in the Monterey Canyon by the Monterey Bay Aquarium Research Institute, brooding her eggs for a record 53 months, making this the longest brooding or pregnancy period known in the animal kingdom. This also makes it the longest living octopus – most octopuses only live for 1 or 2 years – which this octopus beats with its brooding period alone. Female Graneledone boreopacifica tend to brood their eggs between the depths of 1,200 and 2,000 m; the eggs were never unattended.

Examination of the gut of this octopus revealed significant amounts of crushed gastropod shells (Provanna variabilis and Lepetodrilus fucensis). The mandible muscles exhibit remarkable strength to crush the shells before digestion.

References

External links

Octopodidae
Molluscs described in 1982